Bad Hombre is a studio album by drummer Antonio Sánchez released on September 29, 2017 via CAM Jazz label. This is his sixth album as a leader. In 2018, the album was nominated for Grammy Award for Best Contemporary Instrumental Album.

Reception
Mike Hobart of Financial Times stated "Here, he develops his grasp of the cinematic with an atmospheric and imaginative solo recording that envelops beautifully formed drum creations with layers of keyboards and electronica. The album begins with a scratchy recording of Sanchez’ grandfather reading poetry backed by a mariachi band. Mexican roots established, crisp funky beats deliver a platform for the narratives that follow. These are tense and compelling, with a range from the speculative and dreamy to the nightmarish and irate."

Cormac Larkin of The Irish Times wrote "Bad Hombre—named for the alter ego he adopts therein—is a bravura display of contemporary acoustic drumming overlaid with a pungent, densely mixed soup of keyboards, electronic noise and voice, the answer to the question: if a great drummer can play anything he wants, what does he play?"

Track listing

Personnel
Antonio Sanchez – composer, producer, liner notes, drums, keyboards, electronics, voice, engineering, mixing, cover (concept)
Ignacio López Tarso – performer (track 1)
Justin Bettman – photographer
Pete Karam – mixing, mastering
Ermanno Basso – executive producer
Thana Alexa – cover (design)

References 

2017 albums
CAM Jazz albums
Antonio Sánchez (drummer) albums